Ivan Vasilyevich Arkhipov (Kaluga,  – Moscow, 28 February 1998) was a Soviet and Russian statesman who was First Deputy of the Council of Ministers from 1980 to 1986.

In 1950 Stalin sent him as an economic adviser to China, where he spent much of the next 10 years.

Honours and awards
 Hero of Socialist Labour (1977)
 Five Orders of Lenin
 Order of the October Revolution
 Order of the Red Banner of Labour, twice

References

1907 births
1997 deaths
People from Kaluga
People from Kaluzhsky Uyezd
Central Committee of the Communist Party of the Soviet Union members
People's commissars and ministers of the Soviet Union
Ninth convocation members of the Soviet of Nationalities
Tenth convocation members of the Soviet of Nationalities
Eleventh convocation members of the Soviet of Nationalities
Russian communists
Soviet expatriates in China
Heroes of Socialist Labour
Recipients of the Order of Lenin
Recipients of the Order of the Red Banner of Labour
Burials in Troyekurovskoye Cemetery